Mikhail Sarmatin (born October 26, 1972) is a Russian former professional ice hockey forward, who played for the Russia in WC 1997, WC 1998 and WC 1999. After completing his career as a player, he became a coach.

Awards and honors

References

External links
Biographical information and career statistics from Eliteprospects.com, or The Internet Hockey Database

1972 births
Living people
Ak Bars Kazan players
HC Neftekhimik Nizhnekamsk players
Metallurg Magnitogorsk players
HC Sibir Novosibirsk players
Torpedo Nizhny Novgorod players
Amur Khabarovsk players
Traktor Chelyabinsk players
Russian ice hockey forwards